The Order of the Condor of the Andes is a state decoration of the Plurinational State of Bolivia instituted on 12 April 1925. The Order is awarded for exceptional merit, either civil or military, shown by Bolivians or foreign nationals. There are six grades: Grand Collar, Grand Cross, Grand Officer, Commander, Officer, and Knight.

Recipients 

Recipients of the Order include:
 Konrad Adenauer, German chancellor
 Xavier Albó Corrons, Jesuit priest, expert in the indigenous peoples of Bolivia
 Hernán Terrazas Céspedes, Bolivian general and Mayor of Cochabamba
 Josip Broz Tito, Yugoslavian politician
 Carlos Calvo Calbimontes, Foreign Secretary of Bolivia
 Pedro Castillo, President of Peru
 Adolfo Costa du Rels, Bolivian author and diplomat
 Jimmy Doolittle, USAF General, Doolittle Raid Leader
  Prince Edward, Duke of Windsor
 Pope Francis
 Ernesto Galarza, Mexican-American activist
  Clark Hewitt Galloway
 Charles de Gaulle, French president
 Javier del Granado, Bolivian poet
 Ram Nath Kovind, President of India
  Carlos Lampe, Bolivian football player
  Ileana Leonidoff, Russian dancer and choreographer, who founded the Ballet Oficial de Bolivia.
  Marcelo Ostria Trigo, Bolivian author and diplomat
  Prince Philip, Duke of Edinburgh
 Koča Popović, Yugoslav politician and general
 Pedro Sánchez, Spanish prime minister
  Haile Selassie I, Emperor of Ethiopia
  Alfredo Stroessner, Paraguayan dictator
  Sunao Sonoda, Japanese foreign minister 
 Sukarno, Indonesian leader 
 Johannes Leimena, Deputy Prime Minister of Indonesia
  Merle Tuve, American scientist
  María Eugenia del Valle, Chilean-Bolivian academic
 Mohammad Javad Zarif, Iranian diplomat and Minister of Foreign Affairs

In 2002 the Order was awarded to the Pan American Health Organization.

References 
 online description

Awards established in 1925
1925 establishments in Bolivia
Condor of the Andes, Order of the
Condor of the Andes, Order of the